Richard Young may refer to:

Arts and entertainment
Richard Young (cinematographer) (1939–2010), American cinematographer
Richard Young (photographer) (born 1947), English society and celebrity photographer
Richard Young (actor) (born 1955), American film and television actor

Politics
Sir Richard Young, 1st Baronet (died 1651), English politician
Richard Young (New York congressman) (1846–1935), House Representative for New York state
Richard D. Young (born 1942), state senator for Indiana
Richard M. Young (1798–1861), senator from Illinois
Richard Young (MP) (1809–1871), British Liberal politician

Religion
Richard Young (bishop of Rochester) (died 1418), 15th-century bishop
Richard Younge or Young (fl. 1640–1670), Calvinist tract writer
Richard Young (bishop of Athabasca) (1843–1905), Canadian bishop

Sports
Richard Young (wrestler) (born 1975), professional wrestler
Richard Young (footballer), English footballer
Richard Young (cricketer) (1845–1885), Irish cricketer

Other
Richard Whitehead Young (1858–1919), U.S. Army brigadier general
Richard L. Young (born 1953), U.S. federal judge
Richard A. Young (born 1954), American geneticist
Richard E. Young, malacologist

See also
Richard Youngs (born 1966), musician
Dick Young (disambiguation)